James Simpson Lord (December 21, 1875 – July 8, 1932) was a Canadian politician. He served in the Legislative Assembly of New Brunswick as member of the Conservative party representing Charlotte County from 1925 to 1930. He also held a position as Imperial Kalif (vice president) for the Ku Klux Klan of Kanada.

References

20th-century Canadian politicians
1875 births
1932 deaths
Progressive Conservative Party of New Brunswick MLAs
Canadian Ku Klux Klan members